The 2006–07 Los Angeles Kings season was the 40th season (39th season of play) for the National Hockey League franchise. This season marked the beginning of a rebuilding phase, as the team hired Marc Crawford as their new head coach, the former general manager of the San Jose Sharks, Dean Lombardi, as their new GM, former NHL goaltenders Ron Hextall as assistant GM (and GM of their AHL affiliate Manchester Monarchs), and Bill Ranford as goaltending coach. Their first big move came when they acquired rookie prospect Patrick O'Sullivan, along with a 2006 first-round draft pick (Trevor Lewis), from the Minnesota Wild for forward Pavol Demitra on June 24, 2006.

But the biggest move of the off-season for the Kings was acquiring goaltender Dan Cloutier from the Vancouver Canucks in exchange for a 2007 second-round draft pick and a 2009 conditional draft pick on July 5, 2006. He was then named the team's starting goaltender ahead of Mathieu Garon, whom many fans expected to be their number-one goaltender.  Before the season got underway, he was signed to a two-year contract, expecting a great performance from the former Canuck. However, at the end of December, Dan Cloutier was last in save percentage and goals against average (GAA) amongst NHL goaltenders who have played at least 12 games.

Injuries to both Garon and Cloutier in January prompted the Kings to recall Yutaka Fukufuji as an emergency goaltender, who made his NHL debut on January 13 against the St. Louis Blues, becoming the first Japanese-born player in NHL history. On January 18, prior to a home game against St. Louis, the Kings claimed goaltender Sean Burke off of waivers from the Tampa Bay Lightning.  Burke would be the fifth goaltender to play for the Kings during the season (after Cloutier, Garon, Barry Brust and Fukufuji). This marked the first time the Kings have had at least five goaltenders appear during one season since the 2000–01 season (Jamie Storr, Felix Potvin, Steve Passmore, Stephane Fiset and Travis Scott).

On January 20, 2007, prior to a night-game against the Phoenix Coyotes, the Los Angeles Kings officially retired Luc Robitaille's number 20 sweater. This makes him the fifth player to have his number retired by the Los Angeles Kings, along with Rogie Vachon, Marcel Dionne, Dave Taylor and Wayne Gretzky.

Regular season

The Kings struggled on the penalty kill, finishing the regular season 30th overall in penalty-kill percentage, at 77.86%.

Season standings

Schedule and results

October

November

December

January

February

March

April

Playoffs 
The Kings were eliminated from playoff contention for the fourth consecutive season.

Player statistics

Transactions
The Kings were involved in the following transactions during the 2006–07 season.

Trades

Free agent signings

Free agents lost

Waivers

See also
2006–07 NHL season

References

Game log: Los Angeles Kings game log  on ESPN.com
Team standings: NHL standings  on ESPN.com
Player stats: Los Angeles Kings player stats  on ESPN.com

Los
Los
Los Angeles Kings seasons
LA Kings
LA Kings